Hariraha is ward in Dakneshwori Municipality in Saptari District in the Sagarmatha Zone of south-eastern Nepal. At the time of the 2011 Nepal census it had a population of 2,028.

References 

 https://web.archive.org/web/20181005234846/http://cbs.gov.np/image/data/Population/VDC-Municipality.  Government of Nepal. National Planning Commission. November 2012.
 https://election.ekantipur.com/pradesh-2/district-saptari?lng=eng. Kantipur Newspaper
 https://thehimalayantimes.com/tag/saptari-election-results/.
 https://web.archive.org/web/20180831065451/http://103.69.124.141/

Saptari District